Schneider Glacier is a glacier in the Heritage Range in Antarctica. It was mapped by United States Geological Survey (USGS) from surveys and U.S. Navy air photos, 1961–66. It was named by Advisory Committee on Antarctic Names (US-ACAN) for Commander Arthur F. Schneider, Maintenance Officer of U.S. Navy Squadron VX-6 during Deep Freeze 1965, and Commanding Officer in 1968.

See also
 List of glaciers in the Antarctic
 Glaciology

References

 

Glaciers of Ellsworth Land